The Last Bus is a 2021 drama film directed by Gillies MacKinnon. It stars Timothy Spall as an elderly gentleman who travels the length of the United Kingdom to scatter his late wife's ashes. It was released in the United Kingdom on 27 August 2021.

Plot 
Following the death of his wife, Tom, played by Timothy Spall, travels from John o'Groats in Scotland to Land's End in Cornwall, England using his free bus pass on local buses, to return to where he and his wife grew up and to scatter her ashes.

Cast

Music 
Sixteen-year-old busker Caitlin Agnew has had two of her original songs, "I Wanna" and "Don't Wanna Go Home", featured in the movie after her father, while working on the movie set, recommended her music to the director.

Reception 
On the review aggregator website Rotten Tomatoes, 50% of 28 critics' reviews are positive, with an average rating of 5.6/10. The critics consensus reads "Not even typically brilliant work from Timothy Spall is enough to keep The Last Bus from sputtering into disappointment."

References

External links 

2021 drama films
2021 films
British drama films
Films about buses
2020s English-language films
Films directed by Gillies MacKinnon
2020s British films